The 2009 Rolex Sydney to Hobart Yacht Race, hosted by the Cruising Yacht Club of Australia in Sydney, New South Wales, was the 65th annual running of the "blue water classic" Sydney to Hobart Yacht Race.

It began at Sydney Harbour at 1:00pm (AEDT) on Boxing Day, 26 December, before heading south for 630 nautical miles (1,170 km) through the Tasman Sea, past Bass Strait, into Storm Bay and up the River Derwent, to cross the finish line in Hobart, Tasmania. Seven Network and Yahoo!7 provided a live, 90-minute webcast of the start of the race.

Line honours in the 100 boat event were won by the New Zealand maxi Alfa Romeo II raced by Neville Crichton, recording her 146th consecutive ocean classic victory. Defending line honours champion Wild Oats XI was attempting to establish a new record of five successive wins, but was second to Alfa Romeo by 2 hours and 3 minutes. Two True (Andrew Saies) won the Tattersall's Cup.

2009 fleet
100 yachts started for the 2009 Sydney to Hobart Yacht race. Entries were:

Results

Line Honours results (top 10)

Handicap results (top 10)

References

Sydney to Hobart Yacht Race
Sydney to Hobart
Sydney to Hobart
December 2009 sports events in Australia